Bob "Bones" Hamilton (September 8, 1912 – April 1, 1996) was an American football player. He was drafted by the Brooklyn Dodgers in the 1936 NFL Draft, but he didn't play professional football. He was elected to the College Football Hall of Fame in 1972.

1912 births
1996 deaths
People from Sewickley, Pennsylvania
Players of American football from Pennsylvania
American football halfbacks
Stanford Cardinal football players
College Football Hall of Fame inductees